George Johnson (6 June 1915 – 27 June 2006) was a Puerto Rican sports shooter. He competed in the 50 m rifle event at the 1948 Summer Olympics.

References

1915 births
2006 deaths
Puerto Rican male sport shooters
Olympic shooters of Puerto Rico
Shooters at the 1948 Summer Olympics
Sportspeople from San Juan, Puerto Rico